Holne Chase Castle is an Iron Age hill fort situated close to Buckland-in-the-Moor in Devon, England. The fort is situated on a promontory on the Northern slopes of Holne Chase in Chase Wood at approx 150 Metres above Sea Level overlooking the River Dart.

References

Hill forts in Devon